Jyotirindra Bodhipriya Larma (known as Shantu Larma) (Born 14 February 1944) is a Bangladeshi Chakma politician and one of the main leaders of the Parbatya Chattagram Jana Samhati Samiti (PCJSS). He also headed the Shanti Bahini militia until it was disarmed in 1997. He is the brother of late Chakma parliamentarian and PCJSS founder Manabendra Narayan Larma. He is also the president of Bangladesh Adivasi Forum (Bangladesh Indigenous Peoples Forum) and Chairman of Chittagong Hill Tracts Regional Council.

References

Living people
Chakma people
Bangladeshi Buddhists
Parbatya Chattagram Jana Samhati Samiti politicians
1944 births
Comilla Victoria Government College alumni
Bangladeshi politicians